Zhu Fatai (AD 320–387) was a 4th-century (Eastern Jin) Chinese Buddhist scholar, disciple of Tao-an, teaching at Jiankang.

320 births
387 deaths
Jin dynasty (266–420) Buddhists
People from Dongguan